Hickory Grove is an unincorporated community in Horry County, South Carolina, United States, along South Carolina Highway 905. Hickory Grove is located east of Conway and west of Longs.

Unincorporated communities in South Carolina
Unincorporated communities in Horry County, South Carolina